The 2015 season is Santos Futebol Clube's 103rd season in existence and the club's fifty-sixth consecutive season in the top flight of Brazilian football. As well as the Campeonato Brasileiro, the club competes in the Copa do Brasil and the Campeonato Paulista.

On 13 December 2014, Modesto Roma Júnior was elected the new president, after winning by 1,329 votes. On 5 March 2015 manager Enderson Moreira was sacked, and the assistant Marcelo Fernandes was appointed as interim; the latter was definitely appointed as manager seven days later.

On 3 May 2015, Santos was crowned champions of Campeonato Paulista after a three-year absence, after defeating Palmeiras by 2–1 in the finals (2–2 aggregate score, 4–2 on penalties). On 9 July, with the team in the relegation zone, Fernandes was replaced by Dorival Júnior, who returned to the club after nearly five years.

In October, Santos entered in Campeonato Brasileiro's  after a five-year "drought" (precisely 187 rounds). The club also reached the year's Copa do Brasil finals, again facing Palmeiras in a two-legged tie; it was also the first final of the tournament disputed by two clubs from the São Paulo state.

Players

Squad information

Source: SantosFC.com.br (for appearances and goals), Wikipedia players' articles (for international appearances and goals), FPF (for contracts)

Youth players

Appearances and goals

Last updated: 7 December 2015
Source: Match reports in Competitive matches, Soccerway, Campeonato Brasileiro, Campeonato Paulista, Copa do Brasil

Goalscorers

Last updated: 7 December 2015
Source: Match reports in Competitive matches

Disciplinary record

As of 4 December 2015
Source: Campeonato Brasileiro, Campeonato Paulista, Copa do Brasil 
 = Number of bookings;  = Number of sending offs after a second yellow card;  = Number of sending offs by a direct red card.

National team call-ups

Suspensions served

Injuries

Squad number changes

Managers

Transfers

Transfers in

Total spending:  R$ 0,00

Loans in

Transfers out

Total gaining:  R$ 2,000,000.00

Loans out

Contracts

Competitions

Pre-season

Overall

Detailed overall summary

{| class="wikitable" style="text-align: center"
|-
!
!Total
! Home
! Away
|-
|align=left| Games played        || 71 || 37 || 34
|-
|align=left| Games won           || 40 || 31 || 9
|-
|align=left| Games drawn         || 15 || 5 || 10
|-
|align=left| Games lost          || 16 || 1 || 15
|-
|align=left| Biggest win         || 5–1 v Atlético Paranaense || 5–1 v Atlético Paranaense || 4–1 v Marília
|-
|align=left| Biggest loss        || 1–4 v Goiás || 1–3 v Grêmio || 1–4 v Goiás
|-
|align=left| Clean sheets        || 26 || 17 || 9
|-
|align=left| Goals scored        || 120 || 84 || 36
|-
|align=left| Goals conceded      || 68 || 27 || 41
|-
|align=left| Goal difference     || +52 || +57 || -5
|-
|-
|-
|align=left| Yellow cards       || 156 || 70 || 86
|-
|align=left| Red cards     || 14 || 4 || 10
|-
|align=left| Most appearances   || align=center| Ricardo Oliveira (62) ||align=center| Ricardo Oliveira (33) ||align=center| Lucas Lima (31)
|-
|align=left| Top scorer || align=center| Ricardo Oliveira (37)||align=center| Ricardo Oliveira (23)||align=center| Ricardo Oliveira (14)
|-
|align=left|Worst discipline    || align=center| David Braz  (2)  (12) ||align=center|Geuvânio  (2)  (4)||align=center| David Braz  (2)  (4)
|-
|align=left| Points             || 135/213 (%) || 98/111 (%) || 37/102 (%)
|-
|align=left| Winning rate       || (%) || (%) || (%)
|-

Campeonato Brasileiro

Results summary

Results by round

League table

Matches 

Source:

Copa do Brasil

First round

Second round

Third round

Round of 16

Quarter-finals

Semi-finals

Finals

Campeonato Paulista

Results summary

Group stage

Matches

Knockout stage

Quarter-final

Semi-final

Finals

References

External links
Official Site 
Official YouTube Channel 

2015
Santos F.C.